Bernadette Indira Persaud (born 1946) is a Guyanese painter.  She is a graduate of the University of Guyana and of the Burrows School of Art in Georgetown.  Her style is expressionistic, and bears some resemblance to the work of Isaiah James Boodhoo, Wendy Nanan, and Kenwyn Crichlow of Trinidad and Tobago.  Persaud has also written about art for numerous Guyanese publications.

In 1985 she won the Guyana National Visual Arts Competition. In 2012 she was inducted into the Caribbean Hall of Fame for Excellence.

in 2014 the National Gallery of Art in Guyana held a retrospective of her work.

References

Excerpt from an arts journal containing a curatorial statement by Persaud
Veerle Poupeye. Caribbean Art.  London; Thames and Hudson; 1998.

1946 births
Living people
University of Guyana alumni
Guyanese women painters
20th-century Guyanese painters
21st-century Guyanese painters
20th-century women artists
21st-century women artists